Henry Clay Wood (May 26, 1832 – August 30, 1918) was a career officer in the United States Army who attained the rank of brigadier general. A Union Army veteran of the American Civil War, he is most notable for his actions at the Battle of Wilson's Creek, which resulted in award of the Medal of Honor.

Early life
H. Clay Wood was born in Winthrop, Maine on May 26, 1832, the son of Samuel Wood and Florence (Sweet) Wood. He was educated in the schools of Winthrop, followed by attendance at academies in Yarmouth and Farmington. In 1850, he began attendance at Bowdoin College, from which he received his Bachelor of Arts degree in 1854. After college he began to study medicine with a Maine physician, but gave it up to study law instead. He was admitted to the bar in 1856, and in 1857 he received his Master of Arts degree from Bowdoin.

Start of career
Wood's father was a major general and division commander in the Maine Militia, and for several months in 1856 he served on his father's staff with the rank of major. During this period, Wood attended courses and lessons on military tactics and strategy at Norwich University, and in 1874 Norwich granted him a Bachelor of Science degree "in course" as though he had been a member of the Class of 1856. In June 1856, Wood received a commission as a second lieutenant of Infantry in the U.S. Army, and was assigned to the 1st Infantry Regiment in Texas. In May 1861, he was promoted to first lieutenant and assigned to the 11th Infantry Regiment.

Civil War
After 1861 the onset of hostilities that commenced the American Civil War, Wood was assigned to units operating in Missouri as part of a larger force commanded by Nathaniel Lyon. As head of the Department of the West, Lyon endeavored to keep Missouri from seceding, and to prevent federal arms, ammunition and supplies from falling into the hands of the Confederacy. At the August 10, 1861 Battle of Wilson's Creek, Lyon's force was outnumbered by Confederates and defeated. Lyon was killed, but his efforts to keep Missouri from seceding gave the Union enough time to send more troops and secure the state under federal authority.

Wood was in command of a mounted rifle company at Wilson's Creek, and was wounded in the fighting. Despite numerous deaths and wounds among his men, as well as his own head wound, Wood prevented his company from breaking down during the battle, and then led it in covering an orderly retreat from the site of fighting at Ray's cornfield despite withdrawing while under heavy Confederate small arms fire. In 1893, Wood's heroism at Wilson's Creek resulted in award of the Medal of Honor.

In October, 1861 Wood was promoted to captain, and he served as a recruiting officer on the staff of John C. Frémont during Frémont's command of the Department of the West. He served at the War Department as a mustering officer and disbursing officer on the staff of the Army's Provost Marshal General, and he was promoted to major in June 1864. In March 1865, Wood received brevet promotion to lieutenant colonel for his heroism at Wilson's Creek, and to colonel to recognize his superior performance of duty in the Provost Marshal's office.

Post-Civil War
After the war, Wood was assigned as assistant adjutant of the 3rd Military District of Georgia, and then the Department of the Columbia.  In late 1874, Wood was involved in an incident in Portland, Oregon, site of the Department of the Columbia headquarters, where he became drunk and verbally insulted a junior officer in a public setting.  Department commander Oliver Otis Howard, a fellow Maine native and Bowdoin graduate, upbraided Wood for using abusive language and other unspecified actions "too painful to speak of."  Howard meted out no further punishment, conditioned on Wood's agreement to completely abstain from alcohol in the future.  Wood recovered from this incident, and continued to serve as the department's adjutant.  When Carl Schurz was responsible for administering American Indian policy as the Secretary of the Interior, he requested Wood's assignment as a liaison to negotiate with the tribes of the Pacific Northwest and persuade them to abandon their traditional homes and lifestyles for assignment to Indian reservations.

Later career

Wood was promoted to lieutenant colonel in February 1887, and colonel in November 1893. His later assignments included adjutant of the Department of the Lakes, the Department of Texas, and the Department of Dakota. Wood retired from the Army in May 1896.  On April 23, 1904 Wood was promoted to brigadier general on the retired list.

Retirement
In retirement, Wood was a resident of New York City. He was active in several fraternal and civic organizations, including the Freemasons, Royal Arch Masons, Knights Templar, and Society of Mayflower Descendants. He moved to Farmington, Maine in 1909.

Death and burial
Wood died in Portland, Maine on August 30, 1918. He and his wives are buried at Arlington National Cemetery.

Family
In 1860, Wood married Mary Frances Lord of Standish, Maine. She died in 1866, and in 1869 he married Mary Ann (Ferguson) Bassett of Washington, DC. Mary Ann Wood died in 1909.

With his first wife, Wood was the father of Harry Clifford Wood (b. 1863), a Harvard Law School graduate who practiced in several U.S. cities during his career, and Winthrop Samuel Wood (1865–1937), a United States Military Academy graduate who served in the Spanish–American War and World War I and attained the rank of brigadier general.

Legacy
Mount Claywood, originally Mount Clay Wood, is a mountain in the Olympic Mountains of Washington state that is named in his honor.

References

Sources

Books

Newspapers

Internet

External links
 Henry Clay Wood at ArlingtonCemetery.net, an unofficial website
 
 

1832 births
1918 deaths
People from Winthrop, Maine
Bowdoin College alumni
Norwich University alumni
United States Army generals
Union Army officers
United States Army Medal of Honor recipients
Burials at Arlington National Cemetery